Manoj Kuroor (Malayalam മനോജ് കുറൂർ; born 31 May 1971) is an Indian poet and lyricist who writes in Malayalam.

Personal life
Manoj Kuroor was born at Kottayam, to chenda exponent Kuroor Cheriya Vasudevan Namboothiri and Sreedevi Andarjanam. He is the grandson of Kathakali artist Kuroor Vasudevan Namboothiri. Manoj learnt Thayambaka and Kathakali melam from his father and then from Aayamkudi Kuttappa Marar. Manoj has been playing chenda for Kathakali since 1989.

Manoj studied at Baselius College, Kottayam, St. Berchmans College, Changanassery and then at School of Letters, Kottayam. From School of Letters, Manoj obtained M.Phil for his research on rhythm structures in Kunchan Nambiar's Harineeswayamvaram Thullal. He was awarded doctorate by the same institution for his research on folk rhythms in modern Malayalam poetry.

He joined N. S. S. College, Pandalam as Malayalam lecturer in 1997. He is currently Associate Professor in the Malayalam department at NSS Hindu College, Changanassery. He is married to N. Sandhyadevi and they have a daughter and a son.

Career
Manoj composed two Kathakali librettos Panchali Dhananjayam and Bhagavad Geetha during his college days. He won the Kunchu Pillai Memorial Award for Young Poets in 1997 for his poem Thrithala Kesavan which was based on the Thayambaka expert Thrithaka Kesava Poduval. His first published poetry collection Uthamapurushan Katha Parayumpol (When the First-Person Narrates) contains 30 poems. Critic E. P. Rajagopalan and post-modern poet A. C. Sreehari in their study point out that Manoj follows a rare technique of storytelling in poetry. For this book, Manoj won the S. B. T. Poetry Award in 2005.

In October 2005, he published a fiction poem named Coma in Bhashaposhini, which was later published as an independent book in 2006. For this book, he won the Kanakasree Award of Kerala Sahitya Akademi in 2007.

Manoj has published more than 50 articles on various topics such as western classical music, classical art forms, popular music, folklore art forms, cinema, literature, and cyber culture. He also writes poems and literary criticism in contemporary publications. Some of his works have been included in the syllabuses of various universities in Kerala.

Manoj has written songs for several movies, including a three-scene aattakatha for the film Vanaprastham. He composed music for two of P. Balachandran's dramas Maya Seethangam: Oru Punyapuranaprasna Nadakam and Theatre Therapy.

Awards and recognitions
Kunchu Pillai Memorial Poetry Award, 1997 (Thrithala Kesavan)
S. B. T. Poetry Award, 2005 (Uthamapurushan Katha Parayumpol)
Kerala Sahitya Akademi Kanakasree Award, 2007 (Coma)
Padmarajan Award, 2021 (Murinavu)

Published works
Manoj's published works are listed below:

Murinavu, D. C. Books, 2020
Nilam Poothu Malarnna Naal, D. C. Books, 2015, 
Uthamapurushan Katha Parayumpol (When the First-Person Narrates), Rainbow Books, Chengannur, 2004. 
Nathonnatha Nediavazhi 44: Poems on Rivers, Rainbow Books, Chengannur, 2003. 
Anchati Jnanappana Onappattu, D. C. Books, Kottayam, 1996 
Coma, D. C. Books, Kottayam, 2006 
Shanmugha Vijayam Attakatha, 1989
Rahmania: Indian Sangeethathinte Aagola Sancharam, Rainbow Books, Chengannur
Nirappakittulla Nrithasangeetham, D. C. Books, Kottayam, 
Keralathile Thaalangalum Kalakalum, Sahitya Pravarthaka Sahakarana Sangham, 2014, 

His poems are included in the following anthologies:
Yuvakavithakkoottam, D. C. Books, Kottayam, 1999.  
Kavithayude Noottandu (The Century of Poems), Sahitya Pravarthaka Co-operative society, Kottayam, 2001.
Kavithavarsham (The Rain of Poetry), Green Books, Thrissur, 2003. 
Paristhithikkavithakal (Poems on Environment), S. P. C. S., Kottayam, 2006.
Disakal (The Directions), National Book Trust, Delhi, 2007.

As lyricist
The following table contains the list of songs Manoj has written for movies.

References

External links
 Some poems by Manoj Kuroor
 Some translations of poems
 Malayalam:മനോജ് കുറൂര്

1971 births
Malayalam-language lyricists
Poets from Kerala
Living people
Writers from Kottayam
Malayalam-language writers